Pilophoropsis brachyptera is a species of plant bug in the family Miridae.

References

Further reading

 

Articles created by Qbugbot
Insects described in 1914
Ceratocapsini